Testseek is a review site and review aggregator. The company launched as FMP Publishing AB in Göteborg, Sweden, in 2008, founded by Fredrik Engdahl, formerly Testseek CEO. Since 2019, the company is owned by Open Icecat.

Testseek is a global provider of reviews in all major languages to OEM brands, e-commerce portals, and retailers, which helps consumers make better buying decisions.

History 

In the first years, Testseek (FMP Publishing A.B.) was mainly focussed on exploiting its own web portal. Gradually the focus has shifted towards business-to-business services, enabling the websites of manufacturers and their channel partners by providing expert and user reviews, and award logos.

In 2013, Netvalue (majority owner of Open Icecat) joined as shareholder and helped to expand the customer base.

In 2019, FMP Publishing A.B., the owner of Testseek product, was acquired by Icecat.

References

External links 
 Testseek B2B web-site
 Testseek review portal

Review websites
Aggregation websites
Consumer guides
Information technology companies of the Netherlands